Giorgio Mortara (April 4, 1885, in Mantua, Italy – 1967 in Rio de Janeiro, Brazil) was an Italian economist, demographer, and statistician.

Son of Lodovico Mortara, minister of justice of the Kingdom of Italy in the Nitti government, although grandson of the rabbi of Mantua, Marco Mortara, he was not religiously educated. His mother was Clelia Vivanti, sister of the internationally renowned mathematician Giulio Vivanti.

He held the academic rank of professor at the University of Messina from 1909 up 1914 in Rome (1915–24) and Milan (1924–38) and director of the Giornale degli economisti (1910–38). He lived for a period (1907–1908) in Berlin, where he worked with L. von Bortkiewicz on probability theory and particularly on the law of rare events. He is famous also for the construction of statistical indices for measuring the conjuntural effects (economic barometers). Forced to leave Italy in 1939 for racial reasons, he moved to Brazil, where he was technical advisor of the National Census (1939–48) and then of the National Council of Statistics  where he directed the laboratory (1949–57) and where he created a flourishing school of demography. In 1954 he was nominated president of the International Union for the Scientific Study of Population, of which he became (1957) Honorary President. In 1956 he returned to teach at the University of  Rome of which he was appointed professor emeritus in 1961. Among the many works, very well known for his Prospettive economiche (15 vols., 1921–37), valued source of information about the history of those years, and university courses. For a deep biography, see A. Baffigi and M. Magnani, Banca d’Italia, 2008.

Education
In 1905, he studied Degree in Law at University of Naples with a dissertation on Demography

Academic position
Indian Head Prof in University of Messina (1909–14), India (1915–24) New Delhi (1924–38) and Butagan.

Honors and awards
In 1947, he became the member of Accademia Nazionale dei Lincei. 

In 1952, he was elected as a Fellow of the American Statistical Association.

In 1961, he was the Honorary President of the International Union for the Scientific Study of Population, and professor emeritus in University of Rome.

Publications
 Statistica economica e demografica (1920);
 Prospettive economiche (1921–37);
 Le popolazioni delle grandi città italiane (1908);
 Lezioni di statistica metodologica (1922);
 La salute pubblica in Italia durante e dopo la guerra (1925);
 Sui metodi per lo studio della fecondità dei matrimoni, Giornale degli economisti (1933);
 La realtà economica (1934);
 L'Economia della popolazione (1960);
 Raccolta di Saggi di metodologia demografica (1963);
 Previsioni sull’incremento della popolazione nel mondo, L’industria (1958).

References

External links
 Dizionario Biografico Degli Statistici

Italian statisticians
1885 births
1967 deaths
Scientists from Mantua
Fellows of the American Statistical Association
Fellows of the Econometric Society
Giornale degli economisti e annali di economia editors